The 2011–12 Los Angeles Kings season was the 45th season (44th season of play) for the National Hockey League (NHL) franchise. Although they finished the season with 95 points, and the eighth seed in the Western Conference playoffs, they went on to capture the first Stanley Cup championship in team history.

Regular season
On December 12, 2011, the Kings fired head coach Terry Murray and named John Stevens interim head coach. On December 20, 2011, the Kings hired Darryl Sutter to be their head coach, replacing Stevens.

With only one month to play in the regular season, the Kings were tenth in the Western Conference, two seeds away from a playoff spot.  Their defense and goal tending being the only highlights throughout most of the season, highlighted by Jonathan Quick and Drew Doughty.  The offense was loaded with talent, but unable to find any kind of significant consistency.  Until the final month and a half, when they proceeded to go 12–4–3 in their final 19 games as their offense finally caught fire and started scoring the goals they lacked earlier in the year. Securing the eighth and final playoff seed in their 81st (and second-to-last game), a shoot-out loss to their arch rivals, the San Jose Sharks.

Out of the Kings' 82 regular season games, 21 ended in a shutout; the Kings were shut-out ten times, the most of any NHL team in the regular season.

Playoffs

The Kings made the playoffs for the third consecutive season, needing a win in the final game to secure the eighth seed. The Kings also became the second team to eliminate the first, second and third seeds from the playoffs in the same post-season (after the 2003–04 Calgary Flames), as well as the only team to win the Stanley Cup after defeating the first, second and third seeds in sequence. (Darryl Sutter was the head coach of both the 2003–04 Flames and 2011–12 Kings.) They then defeated the New Jersey Devils in the Stanley Cup Finals, becoming the first eighth seed in North American professional sports history to win a championship. They are also one of the few teams to win a championship after never benefiting from home-venue advantage in the post-season after the 1994-95 New Jersey Devils. Los Angeles would start every series by winning the first three games, only sweeping the St. Louis Blues.

Standings

Schedule and results

Pre-season

Regular season

Playoffs

Player statistics

Skaters

Goaltenders 

†Denotes player spent time with another team before joining Kings. Stats reflect time with the Kings only.
‡Traded mid-season.
Bold/italics denotes franchise record.
Underline denotes currently with a minor league affiliate.

Awards and records

Awards

Records

Milestones

Transactions 
The Kings have been involved in the following transactions during the 2011–12 season.

Trades

|}

Free agents acquired

Free agents lost

Acquired via waivers

Lost via waivers

Player signings

Draft picks 
LA 's picks at the 2011 NHL Entry Draft in St. Paul, Minnesota.

Farm teams

Manchester Monarchs (AHL)
The 2011–12 season will be the 11th season of AHL hockey for the franchise. The Monarchs clinched a playoff berth as the 8th seed in the Eastern Conference in the 2012 Calder Cup Playoffs and faced the Norfolk Admirals, where they were defeated 3 games to 1.

Ontario Reign (ECHL)
The 2011–12 season will be the fourth season of ECHL hockey for the franchise since moving to Ontario from Texas. It saw the Reign capture their second Pacific Division Regular Season championship and their second playoff berth. However, the Reign lost to the Idaho Steelheads in the first round of the 2012 Kelly Cup playoffs. The Reign have never advanced past the first round in their franchise history.

References

Los Angeles Kings seasons
Los Angeles Kings season, 2011-12
Western Conference (NHL) championship seasons
Stanley Cup championship seasons
Los
L
LA Kings
LA Kings